

Events
May 9 – Chinese musician and composer Gao Xiaosong is arrested after causing a road accident in Beijing. He receives a six-month jail sentence and loses his place as a judge in the new China's Got Talent series.
July 25 – China's Got Talent is broadcast for the first time, by Dragon Television.

Albums
AKB48 – Koko ni Ita Koto (Japan)
Aynur Aydın – Emanet Beden (Turkey)
Anne Curtis – Annebisyosa (Philippines)
Dinesh Agrahari Deewana, Mamta Sharma and Indu Sonali – Jaan Marbu Ka (India)
Bülent Ersoy – Aşktan Sabıkalı (Turkey)
Ethnix – Ga'aguim (Israel)
Gugun Blues Shelter – Satu Untuk Berbagi (Indonesia)
Leessang – Asura Balbalta (South Korea)
Nima Rumba – Rangau Ki Ma (Nepal)
Erik Santos – Awit Para Sa'yo (Philippines)
Ali Zafar – Jhoom (Pakistan)

Classical
Mehdi Hosseini – Monodies

Opera
The Chinese Orphan, by Lei Lei, with a libretto by Zou Jingzhi
Dr. Sun Yat-sen, by Huang Ruo, with libretto by Candace Mui-ngam Chong. It is her first opera libretto,

Deaths
January 3 – Suchitra Mitra, Indian singer, 86
January 19 – Hira Devi Waiba, Nepali folk singer, 71 (injuries from a fire)
January 24 – Bhimsen Joshi, Indian classical vocalist, 88
February 8 – Roza Baglanova, Kazakh singer, People's Artist of the USSR, 89 (Russian)
February 20 – Malaysia Vasudevan, Indian actor and playback singer, 66
April 21 – Yoshiko Tanaka, Japanese actress and singer (Candies), 55 (breast cancer) 
April 29 – Vladimir Krainev, Russian pianist, People's Artist of the USSR, 67 (aortic aneurysm) 
May 23 – Pilu Momtaz, Bangladeshi pop singer, 52
May 31 – Ram Man Trishit, Nepali lyricist, 70 (kidney problems)
June 5 – Azam Khan, Bangladeshi pop singer, 61 (cancer)
June 14 – Asad Ali Khan, Indian musician, 74
July 27 – Rei Harakami, Japanese musician, 40 (cerebrovascular disease)
December 8 – Minoru Miki, 81, Japanese composer

See also 
 2011 in music
 2011 in Japanese music
 2011 in South Korean music
 List of 2011 albums

References 

Asia
Asian music
2011 in Asia